is a 1986 Japanese film directed by Nobuhiko Obayashi. It is based on a 1977 romance novel by Yoshio Kataoka.

Awards
8th Yokohama Film Festival
Won: Best Supporting Actress - Noriko Watanabe
Won: Best Newcomer - Kiwako Harada
3rd Best Film

References

External links

1986 films
Films directed by Nobuhiko Obayashi
1980s Japanese-language films
1980s Japanese films